Cefalotin (INN)  or cephalothin (USAN)  is a first-generation cephalosporin antibiotic. It was the first cephalosporin marketed (1964) and continues to be widely used. It is an intravenously administered agent with a similar antimicrobial spectrum to cefazolin and the oral agent cefalexin. Cefalotin sodium is marketed as Keflin (Lilly) and under other trade names.

The compound is a derivative of thiophene-2-acetic acid.

References 

Cephalosporin antibiotics
Eli Lilly and Company brands
Thiophenes
Acetate esters